Ain't No Other is the fourth album released by American rapper MC Lyte. It was released on June 22, 1993, on First Priority Music/Atlantic Records and produced by Audio Two, Backspin, Markell Riley, Franklin Grant, Tyrone Fyffe, "Lil" Chris Smith, Funk, Sir Scratch and Walter "Mucho" Scott.

Ain't No Other peaked at No. 90 on the Billboard 200 and No. 16 on the Top R&B Albums chart, selling 238,000 copies in United States according to Nielsen Soundscan (2007).

Also produced two charting singles "I Go On", which peaked at No. 27 on the Hot Rap Singles chart, and the more successful "Ruffneck", which reached No. 1 on the Hot Rap Singles chart and peaked at No. 35 on the Billboard Hot 100.

Track listing
"Intro" – 0:19
"Brooklyn" (Lana Moorer, Tyrone Fyffe, Franklin Grant, Markell Riley) – 4:03
"Ruffneck" (Lana Moorer, Aquil Davidson, Markell Riley, Walter Scott) – 3:57
"What's My Name Yo" (Lana Moorer, Kevin McKenzie, Scott McKenzie) – 3:38
"Lil Paul" (Lana Moorer, Funk) – 3:27
"Ain't No Other" (Lana Moorer, Backspin) – 3:36
"Hard Copy" (Linque Ayoung, Backspin) featuring Lin Que and Makeba Mooncycle (Kink Ez) – 2:30
"Fuck That Motherfucking Bullshit" (Vaughn Alford, Kirk Robinson) – 3:17
"Intro" – 0:05
"I Go On" (Lana Moorer, Aquil Davidson, Franklin Grant, Markell Riley) – 4:47
"One Nine Nine Three" (Lana Moorer, Backspin) – 3:27
"Never Heard Nothin' Like This" (Kirk Robinson) – 3:06
"Can I Get Some Dap" (Lana Moorer, Backspin) – 3:34
"Let Me Adem" (Lana Moorer, Backspin) – 3:22
"Steady Fucking" (Lana Moorer, Kirk Robinson, Nat Robinson) – 5:08
"Who's House" – 4:50
"I Cram to Understand U" – 7:04

Personnel
 Nat Robinson – executive producer
 Herb Powers, Jr. – mastering
 Merlyn Rosenberg – photography
 Lynn Kowalewski – art direction

Charts

Year-end charts

References

1993 albums
Albums produced by K-Cut (producer)
MC Lyte albums